Córcoles is a river of provinces of Albacete and Ciudad Real, Castile-La Mancha, Spain.

It is a right-bank tributary of the Acequia de Socuéllamos, itself a tributary of the Záncara, a river of the basin of the Guadiana. It rises in the hills near Lezuza.

There are 17 watermills on the river.

References

Rivers of Spain
Rivers of the Province of Albacete
Rivers of Castilla–La Mancha
Tributaries of the Guadiana River